Claire Hardaker may refer to:
 Claire Hardaker (costume designer)
 Claire Hardaker (linguist)